Antero Alberto Ervedosa de Abreu better known as Antero Abreu (February 22, 1927 – March 15, 2017) was an Angolan lawyer, attorney general, ambassador, author and poet.

Early life and education
Antero de Abreu was born in Luanda, Angola, and completed his primary, secondary and high school studies there. He studied law in Portugal, first in Coimbra and then later in Lisbon. As a student in Lisbon he became the leader of the Casa dos estudantes do Império (House of Students of the Empire).

Career

Activist and poet
As an anti-colonial activist, he began writing poetry on the subject, where it was gradually noticed and picked up by various magazines and publications. He remained a productive writer up until his death.

Angolan Writers Union
He was a founder of the Angolan Writers Union, as well as the Academy of Arts and Social Sciences.

Attorney General and Ambassador
He was also the second Attorney General of then People's Republic of Angola and ambassador to Italy.

Published works 
 A tua Voz Angola (Your Voice Angola) (1978), Luanda, União dos Escritores Angolanos
 Poesia Intermitente (Intermittent Poetry) (1978), (1987, Lisboa, Edições 70)
 Permanência (Permanence) (1979), (1987, Lisboa, Edições 70)
 Textos sem Pretexto (Texts without Pretext) (1992)

Death
De Abreu died on March 15, 2017, at the age of 90, of an illness.

References

1927 births
2017 deaths
20th-century Angolan poets
People from Luanda
Angolan male poets
20th-century male writers
Ambassadors of Angola to Italy
Attorneys General of Angola